Kjerstin Askholt (born 7 May 1962) is a Norwegian civil servant. She was the Governor of Svalbard from 2015 to 2021.

Askholt was the deputy director of Bredtveit Prison from 1990 to 1991, deputy director of the Ministry of Justice from 1996 to 1999, and was from 2003, deputy under-secretary of state at the Polar Department of the Ministry of Justice. She was appointed Governor of Svalbard on 1 October 2015.

References 

1962 births
Living people
Governors of Svalbard
Norwegian civil servants
21st-century Norwegian women politicians
21st-century Norwegian politicians
20th-century Norwegian women politicians
20th-century Norwegian politicians